Thomas Gibson George Collins was Bishop of Meath for a short time in the second quarter of the 20th century.

Ordained in 1896, he was firstly a curate at Maralin before becoming Rector of Rathfriland then Warrenpoint and St James’ Belfast; and finally, before his ordination to the episcopate, Dean of St Anne's Cathedral, Belfast.

Notes

1873 births
Alumni of Trinity College Dublin
Deans of Belfast
20th-century Anglican bishops in Ireland
Anglican bishops of Meath
1927 deaths